Shahpar  Football Club (Persian: باشگاه فوتبال شهپر) was an Iranian football club based in Tehran, Iran.that participated in Tehran Football League from 1970s,

Honours
Tehran Football Championship:
 Runner Up: 1978-1979

Football clubs in Iran
Sport in Tehran
1936 establishments in Iran